This is a list of Russian football transfers in the 2017–18 winter transfer window by club. Only clubs of the 2017–18 Russian Premier League are included. It includes transfers that happened before the window transfer window was opened and after the summer 2017 window closed.

Russian Premier League 2017–18

Akhmat Grozny

In:

Out:

Amkar Perm

In:

Out:

Anzhi Makhachkala

In:

Out:

Arsenal Tula

In:

Out:

CSKA Moscow

In:

Out:

Dynamo Moscow

In:

Out:

Krasnodar

In:

Out:

Lokomotiv Moscow

In:

Out:

Rostov

In:

Out:

Rubin Kazan

In:

Out:

SKA-Khabarovsk

In:

Out:

Spartak Moscow

In:

Out:

Tosno

In:

Out:

Ufa

In:

Out:

Ural Yekaterinburg

In:

Out:

Zenit Saint Petersburg

In:

Out:

References

Transfers
2017–18
Russia